Luis Francisco Herrero-Tejedor Algar (born 4 October 1955 in Castellón de la Plana) is a Spanish politician and former Member of the European Parliament with the People's Party, part of the European People's Party. He sat on the European Parliament's Committee on Culture and Education.

He is a substitute for the Committee on Civil Liberties, Justice and Home Affairs, a member of the Delegation for relations with the countries of Central America and a substitute for the Delegation to the EU-Mexico Joint Parliamentary Committee.

Career
 B.A. in Journalism and Information Sciences (University of Navarre)
 Director of Diario Mediterráneo
 Deputy director for news at the Antena 3 radio station
 Editor-in-chief of Época magazine
 Political correspondent for the Antena 3 television channel
 Director of the midday news programme and the evening news on the Antena 3 television channel
 Director of the La Linterna news programme on the COPE channel
 Director of the programme 'La Mañana' on the COPE channel

See also
2004 European Parliament election in Spain

External links

 
 

1955 births
Living people
People from Castellón de la Plana
Spanish television presenters
University of Navarra alumni
People's Party (Spain) MEPs
MEPs for Spain 2004–2009